

Peerage of England

|Duke of Cornwall (1337)||none||1649||1688||
|-
|rowspan="2"|Duke of Norfolk (1483)||Thomas Howard, 5th Duke of Norfolk||1660||1677||Died
|-
|Henry Howard, 6th Duke of Norfolk||1677||1684||
|-
|rowspan="4"|Duke of Somerset (1547)||William Seymour, 3rd Duke of Somerset||1660||1671||Died
|-
|John Seymour, 4th Duke of Somerset||1671||1675||Died; Marquessate of Hertford extinct
|-
|Francis Seymour, 5th Duke of Somerset||1675||1678||Died
|-
|Charles Seymour, 6th Duke of Somerset||1678||1748||
|-
|Duke of Buckingham (1623)||George Villiers, 2nd Duke of Buckingham||1628||1687||
|-
|Duke of Richmond (1641)||Charles Stewart, 3rd Duke of Richmond||1660||1672||Died, title extinct
|-
|Duke of Cumberland (1644)||Prince Rupert of the Rhine||1644||1682||
|-
|Duke of York (1644)||James Stuart||1644||1685||
|-
|rowspan="2"|Duke of Albemarle (1660)||George Monck, 1st Duke of Albemarle||1660||1670||Died
|-
|Christopher Monck, 2nd Duke of Albemarle||1670||1688||
|-
|Duke of Monmouth (1663)||James Scott, 1st Duke of Monmouth||1663||1685||
|-
|rowspan="2"|Duke of Newcastle upon Tyne (1665)||William Cavendish, 1st Duke of Newcastle-upon-Tyne||1665||1676||Died
|-
|Henry Cavendish, 2nd Duke of Newcastle-upon-Tyne||1676||1691||
|-
|Duke of Cambridge (1667)||Edgar Stuart, Duke of Cambridge||1667||1671||Died, title extinct
|-
|Duke of Cleveland (1670)||Barbara Palmer, 1st Duchess of Cleveland||1670||1709||New creation
|-
|Duke of Portsmouth (1673)||Louise de Kérouaille, Duchess of Portsmouth||1673||1734||New creation, for life
|-
|Duke of Richmond (1675)||Charles Lennox, 1st Duke of Richmond||1675||1723||New creation
|-
|Duke of Southampton (1675)||Charles Fitzroy, 1st Duke of Southampton||1675||1730||New creation
|-
|Duke of Grafton (1675)||Henry FitzRoy, 1st Duke of Grafton||1675||1690||New creation; Earl of Euston in 1672
|-
|rowspan="2"|Marquess of Winchester (1551)||John Paulet, 5th Marquess of Winchester||1628||1675||Died
|-
|Charles Paulet, 6th Marquess of Winchester||1675||1699||
|-
|Marquess of Worcester (1642)||Henry Somerset, 3rd Marquess of Worcester||1667||1700||
|-
|Marquess of Dorchester (1645)||Henry Pierrepont, 1st Marquess of Dorchester||1645||1680||
|-
|Earl of Oxford (1142)||Aubrey de Vere, 20th Earl of Oxford||1632||1703||
|-
|Earl of Shrewsbury (1442)||Charles Talbot, 12th Earl of Shrewsbury||1668||1718||
|-
|Earl of Kent (1465)||Anthony Grey, 11th Earl of Kent||1651||1702||
|-
|rowspan="2"|Earl of Derby (1485)||Charles Stanley, 8th Earl of Derby||1651||1672||Died
|-
|William Stanley, 9th Earl of Derby||1672||1702||
|-
|rowspan="2"|Earl of Rutland (1525)||John Manners, 8th Earl of Rutland||1641||1679||Died
|-
|John Manners, 9th Earl of Rutlan||1679||1711||Created Baron Manners of Haddon in 1679
|-
|Earl of Huntingdon (1529)||Theophilus Hastings, 7th Earl of Huntingdon||1656||1701||
|-
|Earl of Bedford (1550)||William Russell, 5th Earl of Bedford||1641||1700||
|-
|rowspan="2"|Earl of Pembroke (1551)||William Herbert, 6th Earl of Pembroke||1669||1674||Died
|-
|Philip Herbert, 7th Earl of Pembroke||1674||1683||
|-
|Earl of Devon (1553)||William Courtenay, de jure 5th Earl of Devon||1638||1702||
|-
|Earl of Northumberland (1557)||Josceline Percy, 11th Earl of Northumberland||1668||1670||Died, title extinct
|-
|Earl of Lincoln (1572)||Edward Clinton, 5th Earl of Lincoln||1667||1692||
|-
|Earl of Nottingham (1596)||Charles Howard, 3rd Earl of Nottingham||1642||1681||
|-
|Earl of Suffolk (1603)||James Howard, 3rd Earl of Suffolk||1640||1689||
|-
|rowspan="2"|Earl of Dorset (1604)||Richard Sackville, 5th Earl of Dorset||1657||1677||Died
|-
|Charles Sackville, 6th Earl of Dorset||1677||1706||
|-
|rowspan="2"|Earl of Exeter (1605)||David Cecil, 3rd Earl of Exeter||1643||1678||Died
|-
|John Cecil, 5th Earl of Exeter||1678||1700||
|-
|Earl of Salisbury (1605)||James Cecil, 3rd Earl of Salisbury||1668||1683||
|-
|Earl of Bridgewater (1617)||John Egerton, 2nd Earl of Bridgewater||1649||1686||
|-
|Earl of Northampton (1618)||James Compton, 3rd Earl of Northampton||1643||1681||
|-
|rowspan="2"|Earl of Leicester (1618)||Robert Sidney, 2nd Earl of Leicester||1626||1677||Died
|-
|Philip Sidney, 3rd Earl of Leicester||1677||1698||
|-
|rowspan="3"|Earl of Warwick (1618)||Charles Rich, 4th Earl of Warwick||1659||1673||Died
|-
|Robert Rich, 5th Earl of Warwick||1673||1675||Died
|-
|Edward Rich, 6th Earl of Warwick||1675||1701||
|-
|Earl of Devonshire (1618)||William Cavendish, 3rd Earl of Devonshire||1628||1684||
|-
|rowspan="2"|Earl of Denbigh (1622)||Basil Feilding, 2nd Earl of Denbigh||1643||1675||Died
|-
|William Feilding, 3rd Earl of Denbigh||1675||1685||
|-
|rowspan="2"|Earl of Bristol (1622)||George Digby, 2nd Earl of Bristol||1653||1677||Died
|-
|John Digby, 3rd Earl of Bristol||1677||1698||
|-
|Earl of Middlesex (1622)||Lionel Cranfield, 3rd Earl of Middlesex||1651||1674||Died, title extinct
|-
|Earl of Holland (1624)||Robert Rich, 2nd Earl of Holland||1649||1675||Succeeded to the more senior Earldom of Warwick, see above
|-
|Earl of Clare (1624)||Gilbert Holles, 3rd Earl of Clare||1666||1689||
|-
|Earl of Bolingbroke (1624)||Oliver St John, 2nd Earl of Bolingbroke||1646||1688||
|-
|Earl of Westmorland (1624)||Charles Fane, 3rd Earl of Westmorland||1666||1691||
|-
|rowspan="2"|Earl of Manchester (1626)||Edward Montagu, 2nd Earl of Manchester||1642||1671||Died
|-
|Robert Montagu, 3rd Earl of Manchester||1671||1683||
|-
|Earl of Marlborough (1626)||William Ley, 4th Earl of Marlborough||1665||1679||Died, title extinct
|-
|Earl of Mulgrave (1626)||John Sheffield, 3rd Earl of Mulgrave||1658||1721||
|-
|rowspan="2"|Earl of Berkshire (1626)||Charles Howard, 2nd Earl of Berkshire||1669||1679||Died
|-
|Thomas Howard, 3rd Earl of Berkshire||1679||1706||
|-
|Earl Rivers (1626)||Thomas Savage, 3rd Earl Rivers||1654||1694||
|-
|Earl of Lindsey (1626)||Robert Bertie, 3rd Earl of Lindsey||1666||1701||
|-
|Earl of Dover (1628)||John Carey, 2nd Earl of Dover||1666||1677||Died, title extinct
|-
|Earl of Peterborough (1628)||Henry Mordaunt, 2nd Earl of Peterborough||1643||1697||
|-
|rowspan="2"|Earl of Stamford (1628)||Henry Grey, 1st Earl of Stamford||1628||1673||Died
|-
|Thomas Grey, 2nd Earl of Stamford||1673||1720||
|-
|Earl of Winchilsea (1628)||Heneage Finch, 3rd Earl of Winchilsea||1639||1689||
|-
|Earl of Carnarvon (1628)||Charles Dormer, 2nd Earl of Carnarvon||1643||1709||
|-
|rowspan="3"|Earl of Newport (1628)||Mountjoy Blount, 2nd Earl of Newport||1666||1675||Died
|-
|Thomas Blount, 3rd Earl of Newport||1675||1675||Died
|-
|Henry Blount, 4th Earl of Newport||1675||1679||Died, title extinct
|-
|Earl of Chesterfield (1628)||Philip Stanhope, 2nd Earl of Chesterfield||1656||1714||
|-
|rowspan="2"|Earl of Thanet (1628)||Nicholas Tufton, 3rd Earl of Thanet||1664||1679||Died
|-
|John Tufton, 4th Earl of Thanet||1679||1680||
|-
|Earl of Portland (1633)||Thomas Weston, 4th Earl of Portland||1665||1668||
|-
|Earl of Strafford (1640)||William Wentworth, 2nd Earl of Strafford||1662||1695||
|-
|Earl of Sunderland (1643)||Robert Spencer, 2nd Earl of Sunderland||1643||1702||
|-
|Earl of Sussex (1644)||James Savile, 2nd Earl of Sussex||1659||1671||Died, title extinct
|-
|Earl of Norwich (1644)||Charles Goring, 2nd Earl of Norwich||1663||1671||Died, title extinct
|-
|Earl of Scarsdale (1645)||Nicholas Leke, 2nd Earl of Scarsdale||1655||1681||
|-
|Earl of Rochester (1652)||John Wilmot, 2nd Earl of Rochester||1658||1680||
|-
|Earl of St Albans (1660)||Henry Jermyn, 1st Earl of St Albans||1660||1684||
|-
|rowspan="2"|Earl of Sandwich (1660)||Edward Montagu, 1st Earl of Sandwich||1660||1672||Died
|-
|Edward Montagu, 2nd Earl of Sandwich||1672||1688||
|-
|Earl of Brecknock (1660)||James Butler, 1st Earl of Brecknock||1660||1688||Duke of Ormonde in the Peerage of Ireland
|-
|Earl of Anglesey (1661)||Arthur Annesley, 1st Earl of Anglesey||1661||1686||
|-
|Earl of Bath (1661)||John Granville, 1st Earl of Bath||1661||1701||
|-
|Earl of Cardigan (1661)||Robert Brudenell, 2nd Earl of Cardigan||1663||1703||
|-
|rowspan="2"|Earl of Clarendon (1661)||Edward Hyde, 1st Earl of Clarendon||1661||1674||Died
|-
|Henry Hyde, 2nd Earl of Clarendon||1674||1709||
|-
|Earl of Essex (1661)||Arthur Capell, 1st Earl of Essex||1661||1683||
|-
|Earl of Carlisle (1661)||Charles Howard, 1st Earl of Carlisle||1661||1685||
|-
|Earl of Craven (1664)||William Craven, 1st Earl of Craven||1664||1697||
|-
|Earl of Ailesbury (1664)||Robert Bruce, 1st Earl of Ailesbury||1664||1685||Earl of Elgin in the Peerage of Scotland
|-
|Earl of Burlington (1664)||Richard Boyle, 1st Earl of Burlington||1664||1698||Earl of Cork in the Peerage of Ireland
|-
|Earl of Arlington (1672)||Henry Bennet, 1st Earl of Arlington||1672||1685||New creation
|-
|Earl of Shaftesbury (1672)||Anthony Ashley Cooper, 1st Earl of Shaftesbury||1672||1683||New creation
|-
|Earl of Norwich (1672)||Henry Howard, 1st Earl of Norwich||1672||1684||New creation; succeeded as Duke of Norfolk, see above
|-
|Earl of Powis (1674)||William Herbert, 1st Earl of Powis||1674||1696||New creation
|-
|Earl of Lichfield (1674)||Edward Lee, 1st Earl of Lichfield||1674||1716||New creation
|-
|Earl of Guilford (1674)||John Maitland, 1st Earl of Guildford||1674||1682||New creation; Duke of Lauderdale in the Peerage of Scotland
|-
|Earl of Danby (1674)||Thomas Osborne, 1st Earl of Danby||1674||1712||New creation; Viscount Latimer in 1671
|-
|Earl of Northumberland (1674)||George FitzRoy, 1st Earl of Northumberland||1674||1716||New creation
|-
|Earl of Sussex (1674)||Thomas Lennard, 1st Earl of Sussex||1674||1715||New creation
|-
|Earl of Middlesex (1674)||Charles Sackville, 1st Earl of Middlesex||1674||1706||New creation; succeeded to Earl of Dorset, see above
|-
|Earl of Plymouth (1675)||Charles FitzCharles, 1st Earl of Plymouth||1675||1680||New creation
|-
|rowspan="2"|Earl of Feversham (1676)||George Sondes, 1st Earl of Feversham||1676||1677||New creation; died
|-
|Louis de Duras, 2nd Earl of Feversham||1677||1709||Also Baron Duras since 1673
|-
|Earl of Burford (1676)||Charles Beauclerk, 1st Earl of Burford||1676||1726||New creation
|-
|Earl of Conway (1679)||Edward Conway, 1st Earl of Conway||1679||1683||New creation
|-
|Earl of Halifax (1679)||George Savile, 1st Earl of Halifax||1679||1695||New creation
|-
|Earl of Radnor (1679)||John Robartes, 1st Earl of Radnor||1679||1685||New creation
|-
|Earl of Macclesfield (1679)||Charles Gerard, 1st Earl of Macclesfield||1679||1694||New creation
|-
|Earl of Yarmouth (1679)||Robert Paston, 1st Earl of Yarmouth||1679||1683||New creation; Viscount Yarmouth in 1673
|-
|Earl of Berkeley (1679)||George Berkeley, 1st Earl of Berkeley||1679||1698||New creation
|-
|rowspan="2"|Viscount Hereford (1550)||Leicester Devereux, 6th Viscount Hereford||1658||1676||Died
|-
|Leicester Devereux, 7th Viscount Hereford||1676||1683||
|-
|Viscount Montagu (1554)||Francis Browne, 3rd Viscount Montagu||1629||1682||
|-
|rowspan="2"|Viscount Saye and Sele (1624)||James Fiennes, 2nd Viscount Saye and Sele||1662||1674||Died
|-
|William Fiennes, 3rd Viscount Saye and Sele||1674||1698||
|-
|Viscount Conway (1627)||Edward Conway, 3rd Viscount Conway||1655||1683||Created Earl of Conway, see above
|-
|Viscount Campden (1628)||Baptist Noel, 3rd Viscount Campden||1643||1682||
|-
|Viscount Stafford (1640)||William Howard, 1st Viscount Stafford||1640||1680||
|-
|Viscount Fauconberg (1643)||Thomas Belasyse, 2nd Viscount Fauconberg||1652||1700||
|-
|rowspan="2"|Viscount Mordaunt (1659)||John Mordaunt, 1st Viscount Mordaunt||1659||1675||Died
|-
|Charles Mordaunt, 2nd Viscount Mordaunt||1675||1735||
|-
|Viscount Halifax (1668)||George Savile, 1st Viscount Halifax||1668||1695||Created Earl of Halifax, see above
|-
|Viscount Bayning of Foxley (1674)||Anne Baber, Viscountess Bayning||1674||1678||New creation, for life only; died, title extinct
|-
|Viscount Bayning of Newport (1675)||Francis Newport, 1st Viscount Newport||1675||1708||New creation
|-
|Viscount Corbet of Linchlade (1679)||Sarah Corbet, Viscountess Corbet of Linchlade||1679||1682||New creation, for life only
|-
|rowspan="2"|Baron FitzWalter (1295)||Benjamin Mildmay, 17th Baron FitzWalter||1667||1679||Died
|- 
|Charles Mildmay, 18th Baron FitzWalter||1679||1728||
|- 
|Baron Ferrers of Chartley (1299)||Robert Shirley, 14th Baron Ferrers of Chartley||1677||1717||Abeyance terminated
|- 
|Baron de Clifford (1299)||Anne Clifford, 14th Baroness de Clifford||1605||1676||Died, Barony succeeded by the Earl of Thanet, and held by his heirs until 1721, when it fell into abeyance
|- 
|Baron Morley (1299)||Thomas Parker, 15th Baron Morley||1655||1697||
|- 
|Baron Dacre (1321)||Thomas Lennard, 15th Baron Dacre||1662||1715||Created Earl of Sussex in 1674, on his death Barony fell into abeyance
|- 
|rowspan="3"|Baron Grey of Ruthyn (1325)||Susan Longueville, 13th Baroness Grey de Ruthyn||1643||1676||Died
|- 
|Charles Yelverton, 14th Baron Grey de Ruthyn||1676||1679||Died
|- 
|Henry Yelverton, 15th Baron Grey of Ruthyn||1679||1704||
|- 
|Baron Darcy de Knayth (1332)||Conyers Darcy, 8th Baron Darcy de Knayth||1653||1689||
|- 
|Baron Berkeley (1421)||George Berkeley, 9th Baron Berkeley||1658||1698||Created Earl of Berkeley, Barony held by his heirs until 1882
|- 
|Baron Dudley (1440)||Frances Ward, 6th Baroness Dudley||1643||1697||
|- 
|rowspan="2"|Baron Stourton (1448)||William Stourton, 11th Baron Stourton||1633||1672||Died
|- 
|William Stourton, 12th Baron Stourton||1672||1685||
|- 
|Baron Willoughby de Broke (1491)||William Verney, 10th Baron Willoughby de Broke||1668||1683||
|- 
|Baron Monteagle (1514)||Thomas Parker, 6th Baron Monteagle||1655||1697||
|-
|Baron Sandys of the Vine (1529)||Henry Sandys, 7th Baron Sandys||1668||1680||
|-
|Baron Windsor (1529)||Thomas Hickman-Windsor, 7th Baron Windsor||1660||1687||
|-
|Baron Wentworth (1529)||Henrietta Wentworth, 6th Baroness Wentworth||1667||1686||
|-
|rowspan="2"|Baron Eure (1544)||George Eure, 6th Baron Eure||1652||1672||Died
|-
|Ralph Eure, 7th Baron Eure||1672||1707||
|-
|Baron Wharton (1545)||Philip Wharton, 4th Baron Wharton||1625||1695||
|-
|rowspan="6"|Baron Willoughby of Parham (1547)||William Willoughby, 6th Baron Willoughby of Parham||1666||1673||Died
|-
|George Willoughby, 7th Baron Willoughby of Parham||1673||1674||Died
|-
|John Willoughby, 8th Baron Willoughby of Parham||1674||1678||Died
|-
|John Willoughby, 9th Baron Willoughby of Parham||1678||1678||Died
|-
|Charles Willoughby, 10th Baron Willoughby of Parham||1678||1679||Died
|-
|Henry Willoughby, de jure 11th Baron Willoughby of Parham||1679||1685||
|-
|rowspan="2"|Baron Paget (1552)||William Paget, 5th Baron Paget||1629||1678||Died
|-
|William Paget, 6th Baron Paget||1678||1713||
|-
|rowspan="2"|Baron North (1554)||Dudley North, 4th Baron North||1666||1677||Died
|-
|Charles North, 5th Baron North||1677||1691||Created Baron Grey of Rolleston in 1673
|-
|rowspan="2"|Baron Chandos (1554)||William Brydges, 7th Baron Chandos||1655||1676||Died
|-
|James Brydges, 8th Baron Chandos||1676||1714||
|-
|Baron Hunsdon (1559)||Robert Carey, 6th Baron Hunsdon||1677||1692||Barony previously held by the Earls of Dover
|-
|Baron De La Warr (1570)||Charles West, 5th Baron De La Warr||1628||1687||
|-
|Baron Norreys (1572)||James Bertie, 5th Baron Norreys||1657||1699||
|-
|Baron Gerard (1603)||Digby Gerard, 5th Baron Gerard||1667||1684||
|-
|Baron Petre (1603)||William Petre, 4th Baron Petre||1638||1684||
|-
|Baron Arundell of Wardour (1605)||Henry Arundell, 3rd Baron Arundell of Wardour||1643||1694||
|-
|Baron Stanhope of Harrington (1605)||Charles Stanhope, 2nd Baron Stanhope||1621||1675||Died, title extinct
|-
|Baron Clifton (1608)||Katherine O'Brien, 7th Baroness Clifton||1672||1702||Title previously held by the Dukes of Lennox
|-
|rowspan="2"|Baron Teynham (1616)||John Roper, 3rd Baron Teynham||1628||1673||Died
|-
|Christopher Roper, 5th Baron Teynham||1673||1689||
|-
|rowspan="2"|Baron Brooke (1621)||Robert Greville, 4th Baron Brooke||1658||1677||Died
|-
|Fulke Greville, 5th Baron Brooke||1677||1710||
|-
|Baron Montagu of Boughton (1621)||Edward Montagu, 2nd Baron Montagu of Boughton||1644||1684||
|-
|rowspan="3"|Baron Grey of Warke (1624)||William Grey, 1st Baron Grey of Werke||1624||1674||Died
|-
|Ralph Grey, 2nd Baron Grey of Werke||1674||1675||Died
|-
|Ford Grey, 3rd Baron Grey of Werke||1674||1701||
|-
|Baron Robartes (1625)||John Robartes, 2nd Baron Robartes||1625||1685||Created Earl of Radnor, see above
|-
|rowspan="2"|Baron Lovelace (1627)||John Lovelace, 2nd Baron Lovelace||1634||1670||Died
|-
|John Lovelace, 3rd Baron Lovelace||1670||1693||
|-
|rowspan="2"|Baron Poulett (1627)||John Poulett, 3rd Baron Poulett||1665||1679||Died
|-
|John Poulett, 4th Baron Poulett||1679||1743||
|-
|Baron Clifford (1628)||Elizabeth Boyle, Baroness Clifford||1643||1691||
|-
|Baron Maynard (1628)||William Maynard, 2nd Baron Maynard||1640||1699||
|-
|Baron Coventry (1628)||George Coventry, 3rd Baron Coventry||1661||1680||
|-
|rowspan="2"|Baron Mohun of Okehampton (1628)||Charles Mohun, 3rd Baron Mohun of Okehampton||1665||1677||Died
|-
|Charles Mohun, 4th Baron Mohun of Okehampton||1677||1712||
|-
|Baron Powis (1629)||William Herbert, 3rd Baron Powis||1667||1696||Created Earl of Powis, see above
|-
|rowspan="2"|Baron Herbert of Chirbury (1629)||Edward Herbert, 3rd Baron Herbert of Chirbury||1655||1678||Died
|-
|Henry Herbert, 4th Baron Herbert of Chirbury||1678||1691||
|-
|Baron Seymour of Trowbridge (1641)||Francis Seymour, 3rd Baron Seymour of Trowbridge||1665||1678||Succeeded to the Dukedom of Somerset, see above
|-
|rowspan="2"|Baron Hatton (1642)||Christopher Hatton, 1st Baron Hatton||1642||1670||Died
|-
|Christopher Hatton, 2nd Baron Hatton||1670||1706||
|-
|Baron Newport (1642)||Francis Newport, 2nd Baron Newport||1651||1708||Created Viscount Newport in 1675, see above
|-
|rowspan="2"|Baron Leigh (1643)||Thomas Leigh, 1st Baron Leigh||1643||1672||Died
|-
|Thomas Leigh, 2nd Baron Leigh||1672||1710||
|-
|rowspan="2"|Baron Byron (1643)||Richard Byron, 2nd Baron Byron||1652||1679||Died
|-
|William Byron, 3rd Baron Byron||1679||1695||
|-
|rowspan="2"|Baron Widdrington (1643)||William Widdrington, 2nd Baron Widdrington||1651||1675||Died
|-
|William Widdrington, 3rd Baron Widdrington||1675||1695||
|-
|rowspan="2"|Baron Ward (1644)||Humble Ward, 1st Baron Ward||1644||1670||Died
|-
|Edward Ward, 2nd Baron Ward||1670||1701||
|-
|Baron Colepeper (1644)||Thomas Colepeper, 2nd Baron Colepeper||1660||1689||
|-
|Baron Astley of Reading (1644)||Jacob Astley, 3rd Baron Astley of Reading||1662||1688||
|-
|rowspan="2"|Baron Lucas of Shenfield (1645)||John Lucas, 1st Baron Lucas of Shenfield||1645||1671||Died
|-
|Charles Lucas, 2nd Baron Lucas of Shenfield||1671||1688||
|-
|Baron Belasyse (1645)||John Belasyse, 1st Baron Belasyse||1645||1689||
|-
|Baron Rockingham (1645)||Edward Watson, 2nd Baron Rockingham||1653||1689||
|-
|Baron Gerard of Brandon (1645)||Charles Gerard, 1st Baron Gerard of Brandon||1645||1694||Created Earl of Macclesfield, see above
|-
|Baron Lexinton (1645)||Robert Sutton, 2nd Baron Lexinton||1668||1723||
|-
|Baron Wotton (1650)||Charles Kirkhoven, 1st Baron Wotton||1650||1683||
|-
|Baron Langdale (1658)||Marmaduke Langdale, 2nd Baron Langdale||1661||1703||
|-
|Baron Crofts (1658)||William Crofts, 1st Baron Crofts||1658||1677||Died, title extinct
|-
|rowspan="2"|Baron Berkeley of Stratton (1658)||John Berkeley, 1st Baron Berkeley of Stratton||1658||1678||Died
|-
|Charles Berkeley, 2nd Baron Berkeley of Stratton||1678||1681||
|-
|Baron Ashley (1661)||Anthony Ashley Cooper, 1st Baron Ashley||1661||1683||Created Earl of Shaftesbury, see above
|-
|rowspan="2"|Baron Cornwallis (1661)||Charles Cornwallis, 2nd Baron Cornwallis||1662||1673||Died
|-
|Charles Cornwallis, 3rd Baron Cornwallis||1673||1698||
|-
|rowspan="2"|Baron Crew (1661)||John Crew, 1st Baron Crew||1661||1679||Died
|-
|Thomas Crew, 2nd Baron Crew||1679||1697||
|-
|Baron Delamer (1661)||George Booth, 1st Baron Delamer||1661||1684||
|-
|Baron Holles (1661)||Denzil Holles, 1st Baron Holles||1661||1680||
|-
|Baron Townshend (1661)||Horatio Townshend, 1st Baron Townshend||1661||1687||
|-
|Baron (A)bergavenny (1662)||George Nevill, 12th Baron Bergavenny||1666||1695||
|-
|Baron Lucas of Crudwell (1663)||Mary Grey, 1st Baroness Lucas||1663||1702||
|-
|Baron Arundell of Trerice (1664)||Richard Arundell, 1st Baron Arundell of Trerice||1664||1687||
|-
|Baron Arlington (1664)||Henry Bennet, 1st Baron Arlington||1664||1685||Created Earl of Arlington, see above
|-
|Baron Frescheville (1665)||John Frescheville, 1st Baron Frescheville||1665||1682||
|-
|Baron Howard of Castle Rising (1669)||Henry Howard, 1st Baron Howard of Castle Rising||1669||1684||Created Earl of Norwich in 1672; succeeded as Duke of Norfolk in 1677, see above
|-
|rowspan="2"|Baron Clifford of Chudleigh (1672)||Thomas Clifford, 1st Baron Clifford of Chudleigh||1672||1673||New creation; died
|-
|Hugh Clifford, 2nd Baron Clifford of Chudleigh||1673||1730||
|-
|Baron Finch (1674)||Heneage Finch, 1st Baron Finch||1674||1682||New creation
|-
|Baron Belasyse of Osgodby (1674)||Susan Belasyse, Baroness Belasyse||1674||1713||New creation
|-
|}

Peerage of Scotland

|Duke of Rothesay (1398)||none||1649||1688||
|-
|Duke of Lennox (1581)||Charles Stewart, 6th Duke of Lennox||1660||1672||Died, title extinct
|-
|Duke of Hamilton (1643)||Anne Hamilton, 3rd Duchess of Hamilton||1651||1698||
|-
|Duke of Albany (1660)||Prince James, Duke of Albany||1660||1685||
|-
|Duke of Buccleuch (1663)||Anne Scott, 1st Duchess of Buccleuch||1663||1732||
|-
|Duke of Lauderdale (1672)||John Maitland, 1st Duke of Lauderdale||1672||1682||New creation
|-
|Duke of Lennox (1675)||Charles Lennox, 1st Duke of Lennox||1675||1723||New creation
|-
|Marquess of Huntly (1599)||George Gordon, 4th Marquess of Huntly||1653||1716||
|-
|Marquess of Douglas (1633)||James Douglas, 2nd Marquess of Douglas||1660||1700||
|-
|Marquess of Montrose (1644)||James Graham, 3rd Marquess of Montrose||1669||1684||
|-
|Marquess of Atholl (1676)||John Murray, 1st Marquess of Atholl||1676||1703||
|-
|Earl of Argyll (1457)||Archibald Campbell, 9th Earl of Argyll||1663||1685||
|-
|rowspan=2|Earl of Crawford (1398)||John Lindsay, 17th Earl of Crawford||1652||1678||Died
|-
|William Lindsay, 18th Earl of Crawford||1678||1698||
|-
|rowspan=2|Earl of Erroll (1452)||Gilbert Hay, 11th Earl of Erroll||1636||1674||Died
|-
|John Hay, 12th Earl of Erroll||1674||1704||
|-
|rowspan=2|Earl Marischal (1458)||William Keith, 7th Earl Marischal||1635||1671||Died
|-
|George Keith, 8th Earl Marischal||1671||1694||
|-
|rowspan=2|Earl of Sutherland (1235)||John Gordon, 14th Earl of Sutherland||1615||1679||Died
|-
|George Gordon, 15th Earl of Sutherland||1679||1703||
|-
|Earl of Mar (1114)||Charles Erskine, Earl of Mar||1668||1689||
|-
|Earl of Rothes (1458)||John Leslie, 7th Earl of Rothes||1641||1681||
|-
|Earl of Morton (1458)||William Douglas, 9th Earl of Morton||1649||1681||
|-
|Earl of Menteith (1427)||William Graham, 8th Earl of Menteith||1661||1694||
|-
|rowspan=2|Earl of Glencairn (1488)||Alexander Cunningham, 10th Earl of Glencairn||1664||1670||Died
|-
|John Cunningham, 11th Earl of Glencairn||1670||1703||
|-
|Earl of Eglinton (1507)||Alexander Montgomerie, 8th Earl of Eglinton||1669||1701||
|-
|Earl of Cassilis (1509)||John Kennedy, 7th Earl of Cassilis||1668||1701||
|-
|rowspan=2|Earl of Caithness (1455)||George Sinclair, 6th Earl of Caithness||1643||1672||
|-
|In dispute||1672||1681||
|-
|Earl of Buchan (1469)||William Erskine, 8th Earl of Buchan||1664||1695||
|-
|Earl of Moray (1562)||Alexander Stuart, 5th Earl of Moray||1653||1701||
|-
|Earl of Linlithgow (1600)||George Livingston, 3rd Earl of Linlithgow||1650||1690||
|-
|Earl of Winton (1600)||George Seton, 4th Earl of Winton||1650||1704||
|-
|rowspan=2|Earl of Home (1605)||Alexander Home, 4th Earl of Home||1666||1674||Died
|-
|James Home, 5th Earl of Home||1678||1687||
|-
|rowspan=2|Earl of Perth (1605)||James Drummond, 3rd Earl of Perth||1662||1675||Died
|-
|James Drummond, 4th Earl of Perth||1675||1716||
|-
|rowspan=3|Earl of Dunfermline (1605)||Charles Seton, 2nd Earl of Dunfermline||1622||1672||Died
|-
|Alexander Seton, 3rd Earl of Dunfermline||1672||1677||Died
|-
|James Seton, 4th Earl of Dunfermline||1677||1690||
|-
|Earl of Wigtown (1606)||William Fleming, 5th Earl of Wigtown||1668||1681||
|-
|rowspan=2|Earl of Abercorn (1606)||James Hamilton, 2nd Earl of Abercorn||1618||1670||Died
|-
|George Hamilton, 3rd Earl of Abercorn||1670||1680||
|-
|Earl of Kinghorne (1606)||Patrick Lyon, 3rd Earl of Kinghorne||1646||1695||Title changed to "Strathmore and Kinghorne" in 1677
|-
|rowspan=2|Earl of Roxburghe (1616)||William Ker, 2nd Earl of Roxburghe||1650||1675||Died
|-
|Robert Ker, 3rd Earl of Roxburghe||1675||1682||
|-
|rowspan=2|Earl of Kellie (1619)||Alexander Erskine, 3rd Earl of Kellie||1643||1677||Died
|-
|Alexander Erskine, 4th Earl of Kellie||1677||1710||
|-
|Earl of Haddington (1619)||Charles Hamilton, 5th Earl of Haddington||1669||1685||
|-
|rowspan=2|Earl of Nithsdale (1620)||John Maxwell, 3rd Earl of Nithsdale||1667||1677||Died
|-
|Robert Maxwell, 4th Earl of Nithsdale||1677||1696||
|-
|rowspan=2|Earl of Galloway (1623)||James Stewart, 2nd Earl of Galloway||1649||1671||Died
|-
|Alexander Stewart, 3rd Earl of Galloway||1671||1690||
|-
|rowspan=2|Earl of Seaforth (1623)||Kenneth Mackenzie, 3rd Earl of Seaforth||1651||1678||Died
|-
|Kenneth Mackenzie, 4th Earl of Seaforth||1678||1701||
|-
|Earl of Lauderdale (1624)||John Maitland, 2nd Earl of Lauderdale||1645||1682||Created Duke of Lauderdale, see above
|-
|rowspan=2|Earl of Tullibardine (1628)||James Murray, 2nd Earl of Tullibardine||1644||1670||Died
|-
|John Murray, 3rd Earl of Tullibardine||1670||1703||Created Marquess of Atholl in 1676, see above
|-
|Earl of Atholl (1629)||John Murray, 2nd Earl of Atholl||1642||1703||Succeeded to the more senior Earldom of Tullibardine in 1670, see above
|-
|rowspan=2|Earl of Lothian (1631)||William Kerr, 1st Earl of Lothian||1631||1675||Died
|-
|Robert Kerr, 2nd Earl of Lothian||1675||1703||
|-
|Earl of Airth (1633)||William Graham, 2nd Earl of Airth||1661||1694||
|-
|Earl of Loudoun (1633)||James Campbell, 2nd Earl of Loudoun||1662||1684||
|-
|rowspan=2|Earl of Kinnoull (1633)||William Hay, 4th Earl of Kinnoull||1650||1677||Died
|-
|George Hay, 5th Earl of Kinnoull||1677||1687||
|-
|Earl of Dumfries (1633)||William Crichton, 2nd Earl of Dumfries||1643||1691||
|-
|rowspan=2|Earl of Queensberry (1633)||James Douglas, 2nd Earl of Queensberry||1640||1671||Died
|-
|William Douglas, 3rd Earl of Queensberry||1671||1695||
|-
|Earl of Stirling (1633)||Henry Alexander, 4th Earl of Stirling||1644||1691||
|-
|Earl of Elgin (1633)||Robert Bruce, 2nd Earl of Elgin||1663||1685||
|-
|Earl of Southesk (1633)||Robert Carnegie, 3rd Earl of Southesk||1669||1688||
|-
|rowspan=2|Earl of Traquair (1633)||William Stewart, 3rd Earl of Traquair||1666||1673||Died
|-
|Charles Stewart, 4th Earl of Traquair||1673||1741||
|-
|Earl of Ancram (1633)||Charles Kerr, 2nd Earl of Ancram||1654||1690||
|-
|rowspan=2|Earl of Wemyss (1633)||David Wemyss, 2nd Earl of Wemyss||1649||1679||Died
|-
|Margaret Wemyss, 3rd Countess of Wemyss||1679||1705||
|-
|rowspan=3|Earl of Dalhousie (1633)||William Ramsay, 1st Earl of Dalhousie||1633||1672||Died
|-
|George Ramsay, 2nd Earl of Dalhousie||1672||1674||Died
|-
|William Ramsay, 3rd Earl of Dalhousie||1674||1682||
|-
|Earl of Findlater (1638)||James Ogilvy, 3rd Earl of Findlater||1658||1711||
|-
|Earl of Airlie (1639)||James Ogilvy, 2nd Earl of Airlie||1665||1703||
|-
|rowspan=2|Earl of Carnwath (1639)||Gavin Dalzell, 2nd Earl of Carnwath||1654||1674||Died
|-
|James Dalzell, 3rd Earl of Carnwath||1674||1683||
|-
|rowspan=2|Earl of Callendar (1641)||James Livingston, 1st Earl of Callendar||1641||1674||Died
|-
|Alexander Livingston, 2nd Earl of Callendar||1674||1685||
|-
|rowspan=3|Earl of Leven (1641)||Margaret Leslie, Countess of Leven||1664||1674||Died
|-
|Catherine Leslie, Countess of Leven||1674||1676||Died
|-
|David Leslie, 3rd Earl of Leven||1676||1728||
|-
|Earl of Dysart (1643)||Elizabeth Tollemache, 2nd Countess of Dysart||1654||1698||
|-
|rowspan=2|Earl of Panmure (1646)||George Maule, 2nd Earl of Panmure||1661||1671||Died
|-
|George Maule, 3rd Earl of Panmure||1671||1686||
|-
|Earl of Selkirk (1646)||William Hamilton, 1st Earl of Selkirk||1646||1694||
|-
|Earl of Tweeddale (1646)||John Hay, 2nd Earl of Tweeddale||1653||1697||
|-
|rowspan=2|Earl of Northesk (1647)||David Carnegie, 2nd Earl of Northesk||1667||1679||Died
|-
|David Carnegie, 3rd Earl of Northesk||1679||1688||
|-
|Earl of Kincardine (1647)||Alexander Bruce, 2nd Earl of Kincardine||1662||1680||
|-
|Earl of Balcarres (1651)||Colin Lindsay, 3rd Earl of Balcarres||1662||1722||
|-
|Earl of Tarras (1660)||Walter Scott, Earl of Tarras||1660||1693||
|-
|Earl of Aboyne (1660)||Charles Gordon, 1st Earl of Aboyne||1660||1681||
|-
|rowspan=2|Earl of Middleton (1660)||John Middleton, 1st Earl of Middleton||1660||1674||Died
|-
|Charles Middleton, 2nd Earl of Middleton||1674||1695||
|-
|rowspan=2|Earl of Newburgh (1660)||James Levingston, 1st Earl of Newburgh||1660||1670||Died
|-
|Charles Livingston, 2nd Earl of Newburgh||1670||1755||
|-
|rowspan=2|Earl of Annandale and Hartfell (1661)||James Johnstone, 1st Earl of Annandale and Hartfell||1661||1672||Died
|-
|William Johnstone, 2nd Earl of Annandale and Hartfell||1672||1721||
|-
|Earl of Kilmarnock (1661)||William Boyd, 1st Earl of Kilmarnock||1661||1692||
|-
|Earl of Forfar (1661)||Archibald Douglas, 1st Earl of Forfar||1661||1712||
|-
|Earl of Dundonald (1669)||William Cochrane, 1st Earl of Dundonald||1669||1685||
|-
|Earl of Dumbarton (1675)||George Douglas, 1st Earl of Dumbarton||1675||1692||New creation
|-
|Earl of Kintore (1677)||John Keith, 1st Earl of Kintore||1677||1714||New creation
|-
|Earl of Breadalbane and Holland (1677)||John Campbell, 1st Earl of Breadalbane and Holland||1677||1717||New creation
|-
|Viscount of Falkland (1620)||Anthony Cary, 5th Viscount of Falkland||1663||1694||
|-
|Viscount of Dunbar (1620)||Robert Constable, 3rd Viscount of Dunbar||1668||1714||
|-
|Viscount of Stormont (1621)||David Murray, 5th Viscount of Stormont||1668||1731||
|-
|Viscount of Kenmure (1633)||Alexander Gordon, 5th Viscount of Kenmure||1663||1698||
|-
|Viscount of Arbuthnott (1641)||Robert Arbuthnot, 2nd Viscount of Arbuthnott||1655||1682||
|-
|rowspan=2|Viscount of Frendraught (1642)||James Crichton, 2nd Viscount of Frendraught||1650||1678||Died
|-
|William Crichton, 3rd Viscount of Frendraught||1678||1686||
|-
|Viscount of Oxfuird (1651)||Robert Makgill, 2nd Viscount of Oxfuird||1663||1706||
|-
|Viscount of Kingston (1651)||Alexander Seton, 1st Viscount of Kingston||1651||1691||
|-
|Viscount of Irvine (1661)||Arthur Ingram, 3rd Viscount of Irvine||1668||1702||
|-
|Viscount of Kilsyth (1661)||James Livingston, 2nd Viscount of Kilsyth||1661||1706||
|-
|rowspan=2|Lord Somerville (1430)||James Somerville, 10th Lord Somerville||1640||1677||Died
|-
|James Somerville, 11th Lord Somerville||1677||1693||
|-
|rowspan=2|Lord Forbes (1442)||Alexander Forbes, 10th Lord Forbes||1641||1672||Died
|-
|William Forbes, 11th Lord Forbes||1672||1697||
|-
|Lord Saltoun (1445)||Alexander Fraser, 11th Lord Saltoun||1669||1693||
|-
|Lord Gray (1445)||Patrick Gray, 8th Lord Gray||1663||1711||
|-
|rowspan=2|Lord Sinclair (1449)||John Sinclair, 9th Lord Sinclair||1615||1676||Died
|-
|Henry St Clair, 10th Lord Sinclair||1676||1723||
|-
|Lord Borthwick (1452)||John Borthwick, 9th Lord Borthwick||1623||1675||Died, title dormant
|-
|Lord Oliphant (1455)||Patrick Oliphant, 6th Lord Oliphant||1631||1680||
|-
|Lord Cathcart (1460)||Alan Cathcart, 6th Lord Cathcart||1628||1709||
|-
|rowspan=2|Lord Lovat (1464)||Hugh Fraser, 8th Lord Lovat||1646||1672||Died
|-
|Hugh Fraser, 9th Lord Lovat||1672||1696||
|-
|rowspan=2|Lord Sempill (1489)||Robert Sempill, 7th Lord Sempill||1644||1675||Died
|-
|Francis Sempill, 8th Lord Sempill||1675||1684||
|-
|Lord Ross (1499)||George Ross, 11th Lord Ross||1656||1682||
|-
|Lord Elphinstone (1509)||John Elphinstone, 8th Lord Elphinstone||1669||1718||
|-
|Lord Ochiltree (1543)||William Stewart, 5th Lord Ochiltree||1658||1675||Died, title extinct
|-
|Lord Torphichen (1564)||Walter Sandilands, 6th Lord Torphichen||1649||1696||
|-
|Lord Spynie (1590)||George Lindsay, 3rd Lord Spynie||1646||1671||Died, title dormant
|-
|Lord Lindores (1600)||John Leslie, 4th Lord Lindores||1666||1706||
|-
|Lord Colville of Culross (1604)||John Colville, 4th Lord Colville of Culross||1656||1680||
|-
|Lord Balmerinoch (1606)||John Elphinstone, 3rd Lord Balmerino||1649||1704||
|-
|rowspan=2|Lord Blantyre (1606)||Alexander Stewart, 4th Lord Blantyre||1641||1670||Died
|-
|Alexander Stuart, 5th Lord Blantyre||1670||1704||
|-
|Lord Balfour of Burleigh (1607)||John Balfour, 3rd Lord Balfour of Burleigh||1663||1688||
|-
|Lord Cranstoun (1609)||James Cranstoun, 4th Lord Cranstoun||1664||1688||
|-
|Lord Maderty (1609)||David Drummond, 3rd Lord Madderty||1647||1692||
|-
|Lord Dingwall (1609)||Elizabeth Preston, 2nd Lady Dingwall||1628||1684||
|-
|rowspan=2|Lord Cardross (1610)||David Erskine, 2nd Lord Cardross||1634||1671||Died
|-
|Henry Erskine, 3rd Lord Cardross||1671||1693||
|-
|Lord Melville of Monymaill (1616)||George Melville, 4th Lord Melville||1643||1707||
|-
|Lord Jedburgh (1622)||Robert Ker, 4th Lord Jedburgh||1670||1692||
|-
|rowspan=2|Lord Aston of Forfar (1627)||Walter Aston, 2nd Lord Aston of Forfar||1639||1678||Died
|-
|Walter Aston, 3rd Lord Aston of Forfar||1678||1714||
|-
|rowspan=2|Lord Fairfax of Cameron (1627)||Thomas Fairfax, 3rd Lord Fairfax of Cameron||1648||1671||Died
|-
|Henry Fairfax, 4th Lord Fairfax of Cameron||1671||1688||
|-
|Lord Napier (1627)||Archibald Napier, 3rd Lord Napier||1660||1683||
|-
|Lord Reay (1628)||John Mackay, 2nd Lord Reay||1649||1681||
|-
|rowspan=2|Lord Cramond (1628)||Thomas Richardson, 2nd Lord Cramond||1651||1674||Died
|-
|Henry Richardson, 3rd Lord Cramond||1674||1701||
|-
|Lord Forbes of Pitsligo (1633)||Alexander Forbes, 2nd Lord Forbes of Pitsligo||1636||1690||
|-
|rowspan=2|Lord Kirkcudbright (1633)||John Maclellan, 5th Lord Kirkcudbright||1669||1678||Died
|-
|James Maclellan, 6th Lord Kirkcudbright||1678||1730||
|-
|rowspan=2|Lord Fraser (1633)||Andrew Fraser, 2nd Lord Fraser||1636||1674||Died
|-
|Andrew Fraser, 3rd Lord Fraser||1674||Abt 1680||
|-
|rowspan=2|Lord Forrester (1633)||James Baillie, 2nd Lord Forrester||1654||1676||Died
|-
|William Baillie, 3rd Lord Forrester||1676||1681||
|-
|Lord Bargany (1641)||John Hamilton, 2nd Lord Bargany||1658||1693||
|-
|Lord Banff (1642)||George Ogilvy, 3rd Lord Banff||1668||1713||
|-
|Lord Elibank (1643)||Patrick Murray, 3rd Lord Elibank||1661||1687||
|-
|Lord Dunkeld (1645)||Thomas Galloway, 2nd Lord Dunkeld||1660||1728||
|-
|rowspan=2|Lord Falconer of Halkerton (1646)||Alexander Falconer, 1st Lord Falconer of Halkerton||1646||1671||Died
|-
|Alexander Falconer, 2nd Lord Falconer of Halkerton||1671||1684||
|-
|Lord Abercrombie (1647)||James Sandilands, 2nd Lord Abercrombie||1658||1681||
|-
|rowspan=2|Lord Belhaven and Stenton (1647)||John Hamilton, 1st Lord Belhaven and Stenton||1647||1679||Died
|-
|John Hamilton, 2nd Lord Belhaven and Stenton||1679||1708||
|-
|rowspan=2|Lord Carmichael (1647)||James Carmichael, 1st Lord Carmichael||1647||1672||Died
|-
|John Carmichael, 2nd Lord Carmichael||1672||1710||
|-
|rowspan=2|Lord Duffus (1650)||Alexander Sutherland, 1st Lord Duffus||1650||1674||Died
|-
|James Sutherland, 2nd Lord Duffus||1674||1705||
|-
|Lord Rollo (1651)||Andrew Rollo, 3rd Lord Rollo||1669||1700||
|-
|rowspan=2|Lord Ruthven of Freeland (1650)||Thomas Ruthven, 1st Lord Ruthven of Freeland||1651||1673||Died
|-
|David Ruthven, 2nd Lord Ruthven of Freeland||1673||1701||
|-
|Lord Rutherfurd (1661)||Archibald Rutherfurd, 3rd Lord Rutherfurd||1668||1685||
|-
|rowspan=2|Lord Bellenden (1661)||William Bellenden, 1st Lord Bellenden||1661||1671||Died
|-
|John Bellenden, 2nd Lord Bellenden||1671||1707||
|-
|Lord Newark (1661)||David Leslie, 1st Lord Newark||1661||1682||
|-
|Lord Burntisland (1672)||James Wemyss, Lord Burntisland||1672||1682||New creation, for life
|-
|}

Peerage of Ireland

|Duke of Ormonde (1661)||James Butler, 1st Duke of Ormonde||1661||1688||
|-
|Marquess of Antrim (1645)||Randal MacDonnell, 1st Marquess of Antrim||1645||1683||
|-
|Earl of Kildare (1316)||John FitzGerald, 18th Earl of Kildare||1664||1707||
|-
|Earl of Waterford (1446)||Charles Talbot, 12th Earl of Waterford||1667||1718||
|-
|Earl of Clanricarde (1543)||William Burke, 7th Earl of Clanricarde||1666||1687||
|-
|Earl of Thomond (1543)||Henry O'Brien, 7th Earl of Thomond||1657||1691||
|-
|Earl of Castlehaven (1616)||James Tuchet, 3rd Earl of Castlehaven||1630||1684||
|-
|Earl of Cork (1620)||Richard Boyle, 2nd Earl of Cork||1643||1698||
|-
|Earl of Westmeath (1621)||Richard Nugent, 2nd Earl of Westmeath||1642||1684||
|-
|Earl of Roscommon (1622)||Wentworth Dillon, 4th Earl of Roscommon||1649||1685||
|-
|rowspan=2|Earl of Londonderry (1622)||Weston Ridgeway, 3rd Earl of Londonderry||1641||1672||Died
|-
|Robert Ridgeway, 4th Earl of Londonderry||1672||1714||
|-
|rowspan=2|Earl of Meath (1627)||Edward Brabazon, 2nd Earl of Meath||1651||1675||Died
|-
|William Brabazon, 3rd Earl of Meath||1675||1685||
|-
|Earl of Barrymore (1628)||Richard Barry, 2nd Earl of Barrymore||1642||1694||
|-
|Earl of Carbery (1628)||Richard Vaughan, 2nd Earl of Carbery||1634||1687||
|-
|Earl of Fingall (1628)||Luke Plunkett, 3rd Earl of Fingall||1649||1684||
|-
|Earl of Desmond (1628)||William Feilding, 2nd Earl of Desmond||1665||1685||
|-
|Earl of Ardglass (1645)||Thomas Cromwell, 3rd Earl of Ardglass||1668||1682||
|-
|rowspan=3|Earl of Donegall (1647)||Arthur Chichester, 1st Earl of Donegall||1647||1675||Died
|-
|Arthur Chichester, 2nd Earl of Donegall||1675||1678||Died
|-
|Arthur Chichester, 3rd Earl of Donegall||1678||1706||
|-
|Earl of Cavan (1647)||Richard Lambart, 2nd Earl of Cavan||1660||1690||
|-
|Earl of Clanbrassil (1647)||Henry Hamilton, 2nd Earl of Clanbrassil||1659||1675||Died, title extinct
|-
|rowspan=2|Earl of Inchiquin (1654)||Murrough O'Brien, 1st Earl of Inchiquin||1654||1674||Died
|-
|William O'Brien, 2nd Earl of Inchiquin||1674||1692||
|-
|rowspan=2|Earl of Clancarty (1658)||Callaghan MacCarty, 3rd Earl of Clancarty||1666||1676||Died
|-
|Donough MacCarthy, 4th Earl of Clancarty||1676||1691||
|-
|rowspan=2|Earl of Orrery (1660)||Roger Boyle, 1st Earl of Orrery||1660||1679||Died
|-
|Roger Boyle, 2nd Earl of Orrery||1679||1682||
|-
|rowspan=2|Earl of Mountrath (1660)||Charles Coote, 2nd Earl of Mountrath||1661||1672||Died
|-
|Charles Coote, 3rd Earl of Mountrath||1672||1709||
|-
|rowspan=3|Earl of Drogheda (1661)||Henry Moore, 1st Earl of Drogheda||1661||1675||Died
|-
|Charles Moore, 2nd Earl of Drogheda||1675||1679||Died
|-
|Henry Hamilton-Moore, 3rd Earl of Drogheda||1679||1714||
|-
|rowspan=2|Earl of Carlingford (1661)||Theobald Taaffe 1st Earl of Carlingford||1661||1677||Died
|-
|Nicholas Taaffe, 2nd Earl of Carlingford||1677||1690||
|-
|Earl of Mount Alexander (1661)||Hugh Montgomery, 2nd Earl of Mount Alexander||1663||1717||
|-
|Earl of Castlemaine (1661)||Roger Palmer, 1st Earl of Castlemaine||1661||1705||
|-
|Earl of Arran (1662)||Richard Butler, 1st Earl of Arran||1662||1686||
|-
|Earl of Tyrone (1673)||Richard Power, 1st Earl of Tyrone||1673||1690||New creation
|-
|Earl of Gowran (1676)||John Butler, 1st Earl of Gowran||1676||1677||New creation; died, title extinct
|-
|Earl of Longford (1677)||Francis Aungier, 1st Earl of Longford||1677||1700||New creation; also created Viscount Longford in 1675
|-
|Earl of Ranelagh (1677)||Richard Jones, 1st Earl of Ranelagh||1677||1711||New creation
|-
|Viscount Gormanston (1478)||Jenico Preston, 7th Viscount Gormanston||1643||1691||
|-
|rowspan=2|Viscount Mountgarret (1550)||Edmund Butler, 4th Viscount Mountgarret||1651||1679||Died
|-
|Richard Butler, 5th Viscount Mountgarret||1679||1706||
|-
|Viscount Grandison (1621)||George Villiers, 4th Viscount Grandison||1661||1699||
|-
|Viscount Wilmot (1621)||Henry Wilmot, 3rd Viscount Wilmot||1658||1680||
|-
|Viscount Valentia (1622)||Arthur Annesley, 2nd Viscount Valentia||1660||1686||
|-
|rowspan=3|Viscount Dillon (1622)||Thomas Dillon, 4th Viscount Dillon||1630||1672||Died
|-
|Thomas Dillon, 5th Viscount Dillon||1672||1674||Died
|-
|Lucas Dillon, 6th Viscount Dillon||1674||1682||
|-
|Viscount Loftus (1622)||Edward Loftus, 2nd Viscount Loftus||1643||1680||
|-
|Viscount Beaumont of Swords (1622)||Thomas Beaumont, 3rd Viscount Beaumont of Swords||1658||1702||
|-
|Viscount Netterville (1622)||Nicholas Netterville, 3rd Viscount Netterville||1659||1689||
|-
|Viscount Magennis (1623)||Arthur Magennis, 3rd Viscount Magennis||1639||1683||
|-
|Viscount Kilmorey (1625)||Thomas Needham, 6th Viscount Kilmorey||1668||1687||
|-
|rowspan=2|Viscount Baltinglass (1627)||Thomas Roper, 2nd Viscount Baltinglass||1637||1670||Died
|-
|Cary Roper, 3rd Viscount Baltinglass||1670||1672||Died, title extinct
|-
|Viscount Castleton (1627)||George Saunderson, 5th Viscount Castleton||1650||1714||
|-
|Viscount Killultagh (1627)||Edward Conway, 3rd Viscount Killultagh||1655||1683||
|-
|rowspan=2|Viscount Mayo (1627)||Theobald Bourke, 4th Viscount Mayo||1652||1676||Died
|-
|Miles Bourke, 5th Viscount Mayo||1676||1681||
|-
|Viscount Sarsfield (1627)||David Sarsfield, 3rd Viscount Sarsfield||1648||1687||
|-
|Viscount Chaworth (1628)||Patrick Chaworth, 3rd Viscount Chaworth||1644||1693||
|-
|Viscount Savile (1628)||James Savile, 2nd Viscount Savile||1659||1671||Died, title extinct
|-
|Viscount Lumley (1628)||Richard Lumley, 2nd Viscount Lumley||1663||1721||
|-
|Viscount Molyneux (1628)||Caryll Molyneux, 3rd Viscount Molyneux||1654||1699||
|-
|Viscount Strangford (1628)||Philip Smythe, 2nd Viscount Strangford||1635||1708||
|-
|rowspan=2|Viscount Scudamore (1628)||John Scudamore, 1st Viscount Scudamore||1628||1671||Died
|-
|John Scudamore, 2nd Viscount Scudamore||1671||1697||
|-
|Viscount Wenman (1628)||Philip Wenman, 3rd Viscount Wenman||1665||1686||
|-
|Viscount Ranelagh (1628)||Richard Jones, 3rd Viscount Ranelagh||1669||1711||Created Earl of Ranelagh, see above
|-
|rowspan=2|Viscount FitzWilliam (1629)||William FitzWilliam, 3rd Viscount FitzWilliam||1667||1670||Died
|-
|Thomas FitzWilliam, 4th Viscount FitzWilliam||1670||1704||
|-
|Viscount Fairfax of Emley (1629)||Charles Fairfax, 5th Viscount Fairfax of Emley||1651||1711||
|-
|rowspan=2|Viscount Ikerrin (1629)||Pierce Butler, 1st Viscount Ikerrin||1629||1674||
|-
|Pierce Butler, 2nd Viscount Ikerrin||1674||1680||
|-
|Viscount Clanmalier (1631)||Lewis O'Dempsey, 2nd Viscount Clanmalier||1638||1683||
|-
|Viscount Cullen (1642)||Brien Cokayne, 2nd Viscount Cullen||1661||1687||
|-
|Viscount Carrington (1643)||Francis Smith, 2nd Viscount Carrington||1665||1701||
|-
|Viscount Tracy (1643)||John Tracy, 3rd Viscount Tracy||1662||1687||
|-
|Viscount Bulkeley (1644)||Robert Bulkeley, 2nd Viscount Bulkeley||1659||1688||
|-
|Viscount Brouncker (1645)||William Brouncker, 2nd Viscount Brouncker||1645||1684||
|-
|Viscount Ogle (1645)||William Ogle, 1st Viscount Ogle||1645||1682||
|-
|Viscount Barnewall (1646)||Henry Barnewall, 2nd Viscount Barnewall||1663||1688||
|-
|Viscount Galmoye (1646)||Piers Butler, 3rd Viscount of Galmoye||1667||1697||
|-
|Viscount Tara (1650)||Thomas Preston, 3rd Viscount Tara||1659||1674||Died, title extinct
|-
|Viscount Massereene (1660)||John Skeffington, 2nd Viscount Massereene||1665||1695||
|-
|Viscount Shannon (1660)||Francis Boyle, 1st Viscount Shannon||1660||1699||
|-
|rowspan=2|Viscount Fanshawe (1661)||Thomas Fanshawe, 2nd Viscount Fanshawe||1665||1674||Died
|-
|Evelyn Fanshawe, 3rd Viscount Fanshawe||1674||1687||
|-
|Viscount Cholmondeley (1661)||Robert Cholmondeley, 1st Viscount Cholmondeley||1661||1681||
|-
|Viscount Dungan (1662)||William Dongan, 1st Viscount Dungan||1662||1698||
|-
|rowspan=2|Viscount Dungannon (1662)||Marcus Trevor, 1st Viscount Dungannon||1662||1670||Died
|-
|Lewis Trevor, 2nd Viscount Dungannon||1670||1693||
|-
|rowspan=2|Viscount Clare (1662)||Connor O'Brien, 2nd Viscount Clare||1666||1670||Died
|-
|Daniel O'Brien, 3rd Viscount Clare||1670||1691||
|-
|Viscount Fitzhardinge (1663)||Maurice Berkeley, 3rd Viscount Fitzhardinge||1668||1690||
|-
|rowspan=2|Viscount Charlemont (1665)||William Caulfeild, 1st Viscount Charlemont||1665||1671||Died
|-
|William Caulfeild, 2nd Viscount Charlemont||1671||1726||
|-
|Viscount Powerscourt (1665)||Folliott Wingfield, 1st Viscount Powerscourt||1665||1717||
|-
|Viscount Blesington (1673)||Murrough Boyle, 1st Viscount Blesington||1673||1718||New creation
|-
|Viscount Downe (1675)||William Ducie, 1st Viscount Downe||1675||1679||New creation; died, title extinct
|-
|Viscount Granard (1675)||Arthur Forbes, 1st Viscount Granard||1675||1695||New creation
|-
|Viscount Lanesborough (1676)||George Lane, 1st Viscount Lanesborough||1676||1683||New creation
|-
|rowspan=2|Baron Athenry (1172)||Francis de Bermingham, 12th Baron Athenry||1645||1677||Died
|-
|Edward Bermingham, 13th Baron Athenry||1677||1709||
|-
|Baron Kingsale (1223)||Almericus de Courcy, 23rd Baron Kingsale||1669||1720||
|-
|Baron Kerry (1223)||William Fitzmaurice, 20th Baron Kerry||1661||1697||
|-
|rowspan=2|Baron Slane (1370)||Randall Fleming, 16th Baron Slane||1661||1676||Died
|-
|Christopher Fleming, 17th Baron Slane||1676||1691||
|-
|rowspan=2|Baron Howth (1425)||William St Lawrence, 12th Baron Howth||1643||1671||Died
|-
|Thomas St Lawrence, 13th Baron Howth||1671||1727||
|-
|Baron Trimlestown (1461)||Robert Barnewall, 9th Baron Trimlestown||1667||1689||
|-
|Baron Dunsany (1462)||Christopher Plunkett, 10th Baron of Dunsany||1668||1690||
|-
|Baron Power (1535)||Richard Power, 6th Baron Power||1661||1690||Created Earl of Tyrone, see above
|-
|Baron Dunboyne (1541)||Pierce Butler, 5th/15th Baron Dunboyne||1662||1690||
|-
|rowspan=2|Baron Louth (1541)||Oliver Plunkett, 6th Baron Louth||1629||1679||Died
|-
|Matthew Plunkett, 7th Baron Louth||1679||1689||
|-
|Baron Upper Ossory (1541)||Barnaby Fitzpatrick, 7th Baron Upper Ossory||1666||1691||
|-
|Baron Bourke of Castleconnell (1580)||Thomas Bourke, 7th Baron Bourke of Connell||1665||1680||
|-
|rowspan=2|Baron Cahir (1583)||Pierce Butler, 4th Baron Cahir||1648||1676||Died
|-
|Theobald Butler, 5th Baron Cahir||1676||1700||
|-
|Baron Hamilton (1617)||Claud Hamilton, 5th Baron Hamilton of Strabane||1668||1691||
|-
|Baron Bourke of Brittas (1618)||Theobald Bourke, 3rd Baron Bourke of Brittas||1668||1691||
|-
|rowspan=3|Baron Mountjoy (1618)||Mountjoy Blount, 2nd Baron Mountjoy||1665||1675||Died
|-
|Thomas Blount, 3rd Baron Mountjoy||1675||1675||Died
|-
|Henry Blount, 3rd Baron Mountjoy||1675||1679||Died, title extinct
|-
|Baron Castle Stewart (1619)||John Stewart, 5th Baron Castle Stewart||1662||1685||
|-
|Baron Folliot (1620)||Thomas Folliott, 2nd Baron Folliott||1622||1697||
|-
|Baron Maynard (1620)||William Maynard, 2nd Baron Maynard||1640||1699||
|-
|Baron Gorges of Dundalk (1620)||Richard Gorges, 2nd Baron Gorges of Dundalk||1650||1712||
|-
|rowspan=2|Baron Digby (1620)||Robert Digby, 3rd Baron Digby||1661||1677||Died
|-
|Simon Digby, 4th Baron Digby||1677||1685||
|-
|Baron Fitzwilliam (1620)||William Fitzwilliam, 3rd Baron Fitzwilliam||1658||1719||
|-
|Baron Aungier (1621)||Francis Aungier, 3rd Baron Aungier of Longford||1655||1700||Created Earl of Longford, see above
|-
|rowspan=2|Baron Blayney (1621)||Richard Blayney, 4th Baron Blayney||1669||1670||Died
|-
|Henry Vincent Blayney, 5th Baron Blayney||1670||1689||
|-
|Baron Brereton (1624)||William Brereton, 3rd Baron Brereton||1664||1680||
|-
|rowspan=2|Baron Herbert of Castle Island (1624)||Edward Herbert, 3rd Baron Herbert of Castle Island||1655||1678||Died
|-
|Henry Herbert, 4th Baron Herbert of Castle Island||1678||1691||
|-
|rowspan=2|Baron Baltimore (1625)||Cecilius Calvert, 2nd Baron Baltimore||1632||1675||Died
|-
|Charles Calvert, 3rd Baron Baltimore||1675||1715||
|-
|Baron Coleraine (1625)||Henry Hare, 2nd Baron Coleraine||1667||1708||
|-
|Baron Sherard (1627)||Bennet Sherard, 2nd Baron Sherard||1640||1700||
|-
|Baron Alington (1642)||William Alington, 3rd Baron Alington||1659||1685||
|-
|Baron Hawley (1646)||Francis Hawley, 1st Baron Hawley||1646||1684||
|-
|rowspan=2|Baron Kingston (1660)||John King, 1st Baron Kingston||1660||1676||Died
|-
|Robert King, 2nd Baron Kingston||1676||1693||
|-
|Baron Coote (1660)||Richard Coote, 1st Baron Coote||1660||1683||
|-
|rowspan=2|Baron Barry of Santry (1661)||James Barry, 1st Baron Barry of Santry||1661||1673||Died
|-
|Richard Barry, 2nd Baron Barry of Santry||1673||1694||
|-
|rowspan=2|Baron Hamilton of Glenawly (1661)||Hugh Hamilton, 1st Baron Hamilton of Glenawly||1661||1679||Died
|-
|William Hamilton, 2nd Baron Hamilton of Glenawly||1679||1680||
|-
|}

References

 

Lists of peers by decade
1670s in England
1670s in Ireland
17th century in England
17th century in Scotland
17th century in Ireland
Lists of 17th-century English people
17th-century Scottish peers
17th-century Irish people
Peers
Peers